Escuela Deportiva Moratalaz is a Spanish football team based in Madrid, in the neighbourhood of Moratalaz. Founded in 2006, plays in Preferente de Madrid. The team's stadium is the Dehesa de Moratalaz with capacity of 2,500 seats.

History
Escuela Deportiva Moratalaz is created in the year 2006 by the merger of two teams: Club Deportivo Moratalaz and Escuela Deportiva Unión de Moratalaz.

Season to season

2 seasons in Tercera División
1 season in Tercera División RFEF

References

External links
Official website
ffmadrid.es profile

Football clubs in Madrid
Divisiones Regionales de Fútbol clubs
Association football clubs established in 2006
2006 establishments in Spain
Moratalaz